Kenneth Eric Reeve (13 January 1921 – 20 May 2005) was an English professional footballer who played in the Football League for Mansfield Town, Doncaster Rovers and Grimsby Town as an inside forward.

References

1921 births
2005 deaths
Footballers from Grimsby
English footballers
Association football inside forwards
Humber United F.C. players
Grimsby Town F.C. players
Doncaster Rovers F.C. players
Mansfield Town F.C. players
Gainsborough Trinity F.C. players
English Football League players
Clapton Orient F.C. wartime guest players